ASD-STE100 Simplified Technical English (STE) is an international specification for the preparation of technical documentation in a controlled language. STE as a controlled language was developed in the early 1980s (as AECMA Simplified English) to help second-language speakers of English to unambiguously understand technical manuals written in English. It was initially applicable to civil aircraft maintenance documentation. It then became a requirement for defense projects, including land and sea vehicles. Today, many maintenance and technical manuals are written in STE, in a wide range of other industries.

History
The first attempts towards a form of controlled English were made as early as the 1930s and 1970s with Basic English and Caterpillar Fundamental English.

In 1979 aerospace documentation was written in American English (Boeing, Douglas, Lockheed, etc.), in British English (Hawker Siddeley, British Aircraft Corporation, etc.) and by companies whose native language was not English (Fokker, Aeritalia, Aerospatiale, and some of the companies that formed Airbus at the time). There were also European airlines that had to translate parts of their maintenance documentation into other languages for their local mechanics.

This led the European Airline industry to approach AECMA (European Association of Aerospace Industries) to ask manufacturers to investigate the possibility of using a controlled form of English.  In 1983, after an investigation into the different types of controlled languages that existed in other industries, AECMA decided to produce its own controlled English.  The AIA (Aerospace Industries Association of America) was also invited to participate in this project.

The result of this collaborative work was the release of the AECMA Document, PSC-85-16598 (known as the AECMA Simplified English Guide) in 1986.  Subsequently, several changes, issues and revisions were released up to the present issue (the current Issue 8 of STE is dated April 2021). After the merger of AECMA with two other associations to form the Aerospace, Security and Defence Industries Association of Europe (ASD) in 2004, the specification was renamed ASD Simplified Technical English, Specification ASD-STE100. ASD-STE100 is maintained by the Simplified Technical English Maintenance Group (STEMG), a working group of ASD, formed in 1983.

The Copyright of ASD-STE100 is fully owned by ASD.

Starting from Issue 6 in 2013, the Specification became free of charge. Over the years, more than 11,800 official copies of Issues 6 and 7 were distributed. Since Issue 8 was released in April 2021, over 3,200 official copies have been distributed (distribution log updated August 2022). Usually, a new issue is released every three years.

A free official copy of the ASD-STE100 Specification can be requested through the ASD-STE100 website and through ASD-STAN.

Benefits
Simplified Technical English can:
 reduce ambiguity by removing linguistic barriers
 improve the clarity of technical writing, especially procedural writing
 improve comprehension for people whose first language is not English
 make human translation easier, faster, and more cost-effective
 facilitate computer-assisted translation and machine translation
 improve reliability concerns of maintenance and assembly by reducing their probability to introduce defects or human-factor risks.
However, these claims come mostly from those who have invested in developing it, implementing it or supporting it. In the absence of third-party endorsement or published scientific studies, such claims should be considered unconfirmed.

Specification structure
The ASD-STE100 Simplified Technical English specification consists of two parts:
 The writing rules
 The dictionary

Writing rules 
The writing rules differentiate between two types of topics: procedural and descriptive writing. The rules also cover aspects of grammar and style. A non-exhaustive list of the writing rules includes the concepts that follow:

 Use the approved words and only as the part of speech and meaning given in the dictionary.
 Make instructions as clear and specific as possible.
 Do not write noun clusters that have more than three words.
 Use the approved forms of the verb to make only:
 The infinitive
 The imperative
 The simple present tense
 The simple past tense
 The past participle (only as an adjective)
 The future tense.
 Do not use helping verbs to make complex verb structures.
 Use the "-ing" form of a verb only as a technical name or as a modifier in a technical name.
 Do not use passive voice in procedures.
 Use the active voice as much as possible in descriptive texts.
 Write short sentences: no more than 20 words in instructions (procedures) and no more than 25 words in descriptive texts.
 Do not omit parts of the sentence (e.g. verb, subject, article) to make your text shorter.
 Use vertical lists for complex text.
 Write one instruction per sentence.
 Write only one topic per paragraph.
 Do not write more than 6 sentences in each paragraph.
 Start safety instructions with a clear command or condition.

Dictionary
The table that follows is an extract from a page of the ASD-STE100 dictionary:

Explanation of the four columns:

Word (part of speech) -This column has information on the word and its part of speech. Every approved word in STE is only permitted as a specific part of speech. For example, the word "test" is only approved as a noun (the test) but not as a verb (to test). There are very few exceptions to the "One word, one part of speech, one meaning" principle.

Approved meaning/ALTERNATIVES - This column gives the approved meaning (or definition) of an approved word in STE. In the example table, "ACCESS" and "ACCIDENT" are approved (they are written in uppercase). The text in these definitions is not written in STE. If a meaning is not given in the dictionary, you cannot use the word in that meaning. Use an alternative word. For words that are not approved (they are written in lowercase, such as "acceptance" and "accessible" in the example table) this column gives approved alternatives that you can use to replace the unapproved words. These alternatives are in uppercase and they are only suggestions. It is possible that the suggested alternative for an unapproved word has a different part of speech. Usually, the first suggested alternative has the same part of speech as the unapproved word.

APPROVED EXAMPLE - This column shows how to use the approved word, or how to use the approved alternative (usually a word-for-word replacement). It also shows how to keep the same meaning with a different construction. The wording given in the approved examples is not mandatory. It shows only one method to write the same information with approved words. You can frequently use different constructions with other approved words to say the same thing.

Not approved example - This column (text in lowercase) gives examples that show how the unapproved word is frequently used in standard technical writing. The examples also help you to understand how you can use the approved alternatives and/or different constructions to give the same information. For approved words, this column is empty, unless there is a help symbol (lightbulb) related to other meanings or restrictions.

The dictionary includes entries of both approved and unapproved words.  The approved words can only be used according to their specified meaning. For example, the word "" (v) can only be used in one of two meanings:

 To move together, or to move to a position that stops or prevents materials from going in or out
 To operate a circuit breaker to make an electrical circuit

The verb can express to close a door or to close a circuit, but it cannot be used with other connotations (for example to close the meeting or to close a business). The adjective "close" appears in the dictionary as an unapproved word with the suggested approved alternative "NEAR". Thus, STE does not allow do not go close to the landing gear, but it does allow do not go near the landing gear. In addition to the general STE vocabulary listed in the dictionary, Section 1, Words, gives specific guidelines for using technical names and technical verbs that writers need to describe technical information. For example, words, noun clusters, or verbs such as grease, discoloration, propeller, aural warning system, overhead panel, to ream, and to drill are not listed in the dictionary, but they qualify as approved terms according to Part 1, Section 1 (specifically, writing rules 1.5 and 1.12).

Aerospace and defense standard
Simplified Technical English is sometimes used as a generic term for a controlled language.  The aerospace and defense specification started as an industry-regulated writing standard for aerospace maintenance documentation, but it has become a requirement for an increasing number of military land and sea vehicles, and weapons programs as well.  Although it was not initially intended for use as a general writing standard, it has been successfully adopted by other industries and for a wide range of document types. The US government's Plain English lacks the strict vocabulary restrictions of the aerospace standard, but represents an attempt at a more general writing standard.

ASD-STE100 contains a set of restrictions on the grammar and style for procedural and descriptive texts (53 rules). It also contains a dictionary of approximately 860 approved general words. Writers are given guidelines for using technical names and technical verbs in their documentation (only if these terms can be classified in a list of defined categories).

Since 1986, STE has been a requirement of the ATA Specification i2200 (formerly ATA100) and ATA104 (Training). STE is also a requirement of the S1000D Specification. The European Defence Standards Reference (EDSTAR) recommends STE as one of the best practice standards for writing technical documentation to be applied for defense contracting by all EDA (European Defence Agency) participating member states.

Today, the success of STE is such that other industries use it beyond its initial purpose for maintenance documentation and outside the aerospace and defense domains. It is successfully applied in the automotive, renewable energies, and offshore logistics sectors and is now further expanding in the field of medical devices and the pharmaceutical sector. STE interest is also increasing within the Academic world (Information Engineering and Applied and Computational Linguistics).

Tools
Boeing developed the Boeing Simplified English Checker (BSEC). This linguistic-based checker uses a sophisticated 350-rule English parser, which is augmented with special functions that check for violations of the Simplified Technical English specification.

HyperSTE is a plugin tool offered by Etteplan to check content for adherence to the rules and grammar of the specification.

Congree offers a Simplified Technical English Checker based on linguistic algorithms. It supports all rules of Simplified Technical English issue 7 that are relevant to the text composition and provides an integrated Simplified Technical English dictionary.

The TechScribe term checker for ASD-STE100 helps writers to find text that does not conform to ASD-STE100.

See also

Basic English
Constructed language
International English
Special English
Topic-based authoring

References

English language
Technical communication
Simplified languages
Controlled English
English for specific purposes